Mississippi is a state located in the Southern United States that is divided into 82 counties and contains 63 census-designated places (CDPs) in 2018. All population data is based on the 2010 census.



Census-Designated Places

See also 

List of census-designated places in Mississippi
List of counties in Mississippi

References 

Census-designated places